Boonaa Mohammed (born April 14, 1987) is a Canadian spoken-word poet and writer of Oromo descent.

Early life
Mohammed is a second generation Ethiopian immigrant of Oromo ancestry. His Parents came to Canada as political refugees seeking asylum in the country after their involvement with the Oromo Liberation Movement in Ethiopia.

He grew up in the down-town Toronto area and was heavily involved in the street life while attending Oakwood Collegiate Institute. He graduated at the top of his class and was named Valedictorian before enrolling in Ryerson University (now Toronto Metropolitan University) and graduating from the Radio and Television Arts program in 2011.

Career
In 2007, Mohammed won the Canadian Broadcasting Corporation Poetry Face-Off "Best New Artist" award. He also has a playwright residency at Theatre Passe Muraille in Toronto. He has appeared on TedX Toronto and has had a short story published in a Penguin Canada anthology called "Piece by Piece"

Besides poetry and theatre, Mohammed is the founder of Safina Media, an Islamic media production company and has continued the art of story-telling through various platforms of media.

References

External links

1987 births
Living people
Place of birth missing (living people)
Oromo people
Canadian people of Ethiopian descent
Canadian Muslims
21st-century Canadian poets
21st-century Canadian dramatists and playwrights
Canadian schoolteachers
Writers from Toronto
Toronto Metropolitan University alumni
Canadian male poets
Canadian male dramatists and playwrights
21st-century Canadian male writers